Teresa Sapey (Cuneo, Italy, 13 June 1962) is an Italian architect and interior designer.
She studied at Architecture Politecnic University of Turin in 1985, and completed her academic education in París with a BFA degree from the Parsons School of Design and a Master in La Villette. 
In 1990 she moved to Madrid, where she founded her own architecture studio. Sapey is a teacher of Plastic Investigation at Universidad Camilo José Cela in Madrid and has visited professors at several foreign universities (McGill University in Montreal, Carleton University in Ottawa, University of Waterloo in Toronto, and the Domus Academy in Milán). She is part of the Hotel Puerta América Project, designing the parking. In this project, 18 architects worked together such as Jean Nouvel, Arata Isozaki, Norman Foster and Zaha Hadid.

Prizes 
 1998 Competition Domus – Airplane Interiors
 2000 Finalist FAD Prize, Barcelona, Spain
 2000 Competition “Final House”, Osaka, Japan
 2000 Competition Premio di Progetto di Case Riabita, Italy
 2000 Submission to RIABITA Prize of Housing Design, Italy
 2000 Competition al V Premio Internazionale Risorse, Seattle, Washington, USA	
 2000 Competition Ar+D, Emergencies, Architectural Review, London, England
 2002 Competition McCann-Erickson, Madrid, Spain
 2005 Awarded the Official Prize of Architecture of Madrid
 2006 Awarded the Official Prize of Commercial Architecture, Madrid City
 2007 Awarded the Breakthrough Designer of the Year, Wallpaper Magazine
 2008 Awarded the Woman of the Year Award, Women Together Organization
 2009 appointed "Commendatore" by the Italian Republic Minister Napolitano
 2010 "Interior Design Studio" of the year. Architectural Digest Magazine
 2010 Plus Interior Design 2010 (Vía Group)
 2010 Marie Claire Magazine Names Teresa Among the 10 Women of the Year
 2011 Chosen Architect by Citroën to do a personal design of DS3
 2011 OperaHouse, el Cairo Competition Bases
 2011 Golden Medal 2011 of Foro Europa 2001
 2011 Arco 2012 VIP Lounge

Publications 
 Sapone Sapey, Mondadori Electa, Milano, 2010
 Parking, Edizioni Gribaudo, Alessandria, 2008, pp. 12–21
 The Architecture of Parking, Simon Henley, Thames & Hudson, London, 2007, pp. 52
 Cybercafes, Surfing Interioris, Loftpublications, Barcelona, 2007, pp. 144–149
 Dress Code, Interior Design for Fashion Shops, Frame Publishers, Amsterdam, 2006, pp. 298–303
 Bagni, Federico Motta Editore, Milano, 2004, pp. 267–271
 Sapore Sapey, Mondadori Electa, Milano, 2004
 Scale, Federico Motta Editore, Milano, 2003, pp. 228–229
 The International Design Book 2003, Laurence King Publishing, 2003, pp. 126
 Loft, Federico Motta Editore, Milano, 2002, pp. 326–337
 Caffé e Ristoranti, Federico Motta Editore, Milano, 2000, pp. 316–325

References 

 Bibliografía y obras de Teresa Sapey, (en italiano)
 Premio AD al mejor interiorista de España 2010
 Referencia: Premio Women Together 2010 de las Naciones Unidas
 Premio Women Together 2010 de las Naciones Unidas junto a la Fundación la Caixa

External links 
 Web official Hotel Puerta de América
 Lección de decoración con Teresa Sapey. elmundo.es.
 Escala 1:1 - Teresa Sapey, Picasso y Colita.
 La Noche en Blanco: Teresa Sapey; Besos.
 Official Website

Italian emigrants to Spain
1962 births
Living people
Italian women architects
Architects from Madrid